Vasileios Sachinis (1897 – 18 November 1943) was a Greek leader of the Northern Epirote Liberation Front (MAVI) (1942–1943), an organization related to the National Republican Greek League of Napoleon Zervas.

Biography
Sachinis was born at the village of Dhuvjan in Dropull area (south of Gjirokastër) and studied at the Robert College in Constantinople (Istanbul). Then he became a businessman in Gjirokastër. During World War II and after the retreat of the Greek army from the area, he became part of the so-called "Northern Epirote" resistance against the Italian and then the German occupation forces in southern Albania (1942–1943) He protested to the Italian Occupation Forces, accusing them that they supported various activities of the Albanian resistance groups against the local Greek population. He became finally targeted by Albanian communists, he was tortured and executed as an agent (18 November 1943).

See also
Grigorios Lambovitiadis

References

1897 births
1943 deaths
Albania in World War II
Epirus in World War II
Albanian people of Greek descent
Greek Resistance members
Greek torture victims
Northern Epirus independence activists
People from Dropull
People murdered in Albania
Robert College alumni